Rayna Atanasova (born 10 July 1944) is a Bulgarian gymnast. She competed in six events at the 1968 Summer Olympics.

References

External links
 

1944 births
Living people
Bulgarian female artistic gymnasts
Olympic gymnasts of Bulgaria
Gymnasts at the 1968 Summer Olympics
Sportspeople from Varna, Bulgaria
20th-century Bulgarian women